El capitán Camacho is a Spanish-language drama television series created and developed by Juan Camilo Ferrand and produced by Estudios TeleMéxico and Fox Telecolombia. It is based on the life of pilot, radio announcer and Mexican businessman Carlos Camacho Espíritu. The series premiered on March 22, 2015 on MundoFox. It stars Humberto Zurita as Captain Carlos Camacho and José María de Tavira as Young Captain Carlos Camacho.

The series is scheduled premiered August 7, 2017 in Mexico on Imagen Televisión.

Plot 
The series is not only the story of a man, it is the story of all the Mexicans who at the time were subdued and enslaved in their own lands, forced to emigrate constantly to an unjust destiny and forced to work to build a country of which They could never expect a greater reward than survival. Captain Carlos Camacho embodies a history of traitors, of men devoid of all faith, showing that even in the worst circumstances a man can change the destiny of many if he moves a greater purpose, be it justice or revenge.

Cast

Notes

References

External links 
 

2015 Colombian television series debuts
2015 Colombian television series endings
Colombian drama television series
Mexican drama television series
Spanish-language television shows
Aviation television series